Chennai is religiously cosmopolitan, with its denizens following various religions, chief among them being Hinduism, Islam, Christianity, Sikhism, Jainism, Buddhism, and Zoroastrianism. Chennai, along with Mumbai, Delhi, Kochi, and Kolkata, is one of the few Indian cities that are home to a diverse population of ethno-religious communities. With the majority of the people in India following Hinduism, Chennai, like other Indian cities, is home to more Hindus than any other religion. Chennai has centres of worship for a multitude of faiths. According to 2001 census, majority of the population are Hindus (81.3 percent), Muslims (9.4 percent), Christians (7.6 percent), Jains (1.1 percent), Sikhs (0.06 percent), and Buddhists (0.04 percent).

Hinduism

Hinduism is the native faith of Chennai. The origin of Hinduism in the city dates back to antiquity. The temple towns of Mylapore, Triplicane, Thiruvottiyur, Saidapet and Thiruvanmiyur, which are now part of Chennai city, had been visited by the Saivite saints called Nayanmars and Vaishnavite saints called Alvars. The saint Vayilar Nayanar was born and brought up in Mylapore. Sambandar gives a physical description of Mylapore in his hymns:

and Thirumangai Alvar gives description of Thiruvallikeni in his hymns as: 

The early dubashes or Indian merchants who worked for the British East India Company were devout Hindus. The Chennakesava Perumal Temple, considered to be the chief Hindu temple of Madraspatnam and first to be built since the founding of the city in 1640, was constructed by the dubash Beri Thimappa in 1646. Chennai is also an important centre of the Ramakrishna Order whose oldest institution the Sri Ramakrishna Math was founded in Chennai in May 1897. According to a 1981 estimate, there were about 600 Hindu temples in Chennai, including the Chennakesava Perumal Temple, Chenna Mallesvarar Temple, Kapaleeswarar Temple, Parthasarathy Temple, Vadapalani Andavar Temple, Ashtalakshmi Kovil, Kalikambal Temple and the Thiruvalluvar Temple.

Islam

Islam was introduced in the city during the Mughal era and is currently the second largest religion of Chennai, accounting for around 9.4 percent of the population according to the 2001 census. An overwhelming majority of Chennai Muslims belong to the Sunni sect although a small Shia minority does exist. Majority of Muslims of Chennai speak Tamil, while a small minority speak Urdu in a Tamilized version, Dakhini. The "Urdu" speakers mentioned in the previous sentence are mostly the Shias and a small number of Sunni Muslims. The rest of the Sunni Muslims and some Shias speak only Tamil and other Indian languages.

Christianity

Christianity was introduced in Chennai by the Christian apostle St. Thomas, who is believed to have preached in the city between the years 52 CE and 70 CE. St. Thomas, one of the twelve apostles of Jesus Christ, was martyred in St. Thomas Mount in the southern part of the city and was buried in Mylapore. San Thome Basilica, one of the earliest churches in the city, was built in 1523 by Portuguese explorers, over the supposed tomb of St. Thomas. The city has one of the highest population of Christians among major Indian cities, accounting for 7.6 percent of the city's population. The Roman Catholic plays a major role in Chennai's Christian population.

Sikhism
The earliest arrival of Sikhs in the city is not known officially as there are no records. However, the migration is said to have been consistent before, during, and after the partition of India. As of 2012, there were about 300 Sikh families residing in the city, which increased to about 500 odd families by 2019. A gurudwara is located behind the Teynampet Congress Grounds. Sri Guru Nanak Sat Sangh Sabha, established in 1949, is a centre for social, religious and spiritual activities and is a common point for the Sikh families in the city to converge during special occasions and festivals.

Jainism
Jainism was one of the oldest religions of Chennai and, alongside Buddhism, was introduced in the pre-Christian era. There are both North-Indian and Tamil Jains in the city, although the former outnumber the latter. There are about 100 Jain temples in the city built by the North-Indian Jains, whereas there are only 18 Tamil Jain temples catering to roughly 1,500 Tamil Jain families. The Adheeshwar Jain temple in Puzhal, dedicated to Adi Bhagwan, Adeeswar, Adinath, Adi Jain, and Rishabhadev, is believed to be of 1st century BCE. George Town has the greatest share of Jain temples in the city. A North-Indian-styled Jain temple was built at Adhiyappa Naicken Street in 1899. There are two more Jain temples on Mint Street. The Shantinath temple in T. Nagar is a Swetambar Jain temple. Other Jain temples include those in Chintadripet and Vepery.

Buddhism

Buddhism is another ancient religion of Chennai introduced in the pre-Christian era. The city's only Buddhist temple, the Sri Lanka Maha Bodhi Centre, is located at Egmore.

Zoroastrianism

Parsis first arrived in the city in 1809 from Coorg when the ruling King's brother sent a deputation to the Governor of Fort St. George to deliver a picture. Hirijibhai Maneckji Kharas was the first Parsi to land in the city, who was accompanied by five other Parsis and two priests who bought land at Royapuram opposite the Catholic Church. By 1900s, the Parsis established themselves well in the city, dealing in cars, cycles, perfumes and dyes. The first Iranis came to Madras around 1900 and soon became known for their Irani cafes and also established or managed theatres. There was no official priest in the community for over 100 years till 1906. There was no place of worship until the Royapuram fire temple was built in 1909. As of 2010, there were about 250 Parsis in Chennai. Many of them live in Royapuram.

Other religious organisations

Theosophy
Chennai is the international base of the Theosophical Society, a spiritual organisation dedicated to the study of world religions and inter-faith dialogue. Since 1882, Chennai has been the headquarters of the Theosophical Society.

See also
 History of Chennai
 Demographics of Chennai
 Religion in India

References

External links

Religion in Tamil Nadu
Culture of Chennai